Pietie Coetzee (born 2 September 1978) is a field hockey player from South Africa who was born in Bloemfontein. she studied at the Rand Afrikaans University in Johannesburg, Gauteng, and represented her country at the 2000, 2004 and 2012 Summer Olympics.

A striker, Coetzee played club hockey with Amsterdam, Netherlands in the late 1990s. She made her international senior debut for the South African Women's Team in 1995 against Spain during the Atlanta Challenge Cup in Atlanta, Georgia. She was named the South African Hockey Player of the Year in 1997 and in 2002. Coetzee was the top goal scorer at the 2002 Women's Hockey World Cup held in Perth, Western Australia, where South Africa finished in 13th position. In 2007, she played briefly at NMHC Nijmegen in the Netherlands.  Pietie Coetzee became the all-time leading goal scorer in women's international hockey on 21 June 2011 with the third of four goals she scored in a 5–5 draw against the United States in the Champions Challenge in Dublin. It took her to 221 goals, bettering the 20-year-old world record of Russia's Natalya Krasnikova.

International senior tournaments
 1995 – All Africa Games, Harare
 1998 – World Cup, Utrecht
 1998 – Commonwealth Games, Kuala Lumpur
 1999 – All Africa Games, Johannesburg
 2000 – Champions Trophy, Amstelveen
 2000 – Olympic Games, Sydney
 2002 – Champions Challenge, Johannesburg
 2002 – Commonwealth Games, Manchester
 2002 – World Cup, Perth
 2003 – All Africa Games, Abuja
 2003 – Afro-Asian Games, Hyderabad
 2004 – Olympic Games, Athens
 2005 – Champions Challenge, Virginia Beach
 2012 − Olympic Games, London

References

External links

 South African Hockey Federation

1978 births
Living people
South African people of Dutch descent
Afrikaner people
South African female field hockey players
Olympic field hockey players of South Africa
Field hockey players at the 1998 Commonwealth Games
Field hockey players at the 2000 Summer Olympics
Field hockey players at the 2002 Commonwealth Games
Field hockey players at the 2004 Summer Olympics
Sportspeople from Bloemfontein
University of Johannesburg alumni
Field hockey players at the 2012 Summer Olympics
Commonwealth Games competitors for South Africa
NMHC Nijmegen players
African Games gold medalists for South Africa
Competitors at the 2003 All-Africa Games
African Games medalists in field hockey